Warner Park is a community park on the northeast side of Madison, Wisconsin.

Warner Park may also refer to;

Warner Park Sporting Complex, a sporting stadium in Saint Kitts and Nevis
 Percy and Edwin Warner Parks, comprising the Warner Park Historic District in Davidson and Williamson County, Tennessee

See also
 Werner Park
 Chattanooga Zoo at Warner Park